Tongo Field is a football field located in Kenema, Kenema District in the Eastern Province of Sierra Leone. The field is the home ground of Sierra Leone National Premier League Club  the Gem Stars.

Football venues in Sierra Leone
Kenema